Sir Julian William Hendy Brazier  (born 24 July 1953) is a British Conservative Party politician. He was the Member of Parliament (MP) for Canterbury from 1987 to 2017.

Early life and career
Born into a military family, his father being a lieutenant colonel, Brazier was educated at two independent schools: the Dragon School in Oxford and Wellington College in the village of Crowthorne in Berkshire. He then went to Brasenose College, Oxford, graduating with a BA in mathematics and philosophy, later promoted to an Oxford MA. He was the President of the Oxford University Conservative Association in 1973.

Brazier joined the Territorial Army aged 19 in 1972 and served for 13 years, five of which were with 21 SAS(R). He was awarded the Efficiency Decoration in 1993. He was employed by Charter Consolidated Ltd between 1975 and 1984, being involved in economic research from 1975 to 1977 and corporate finance from 1977 to 1981, and was on the executive committee of the board from 1981 to 1984, when he became a management consultant with HB Maynard International, now owned by Accenture.

Brazier contested the 1983 general election in Berwick-upon-Tweed, but was defeated by the Liberal MP Alan Beith by 8,215 votes. He contested the Conservative safe seat of Canterbury at the 1987 general election following the retirement of the sitting MP, Sir David Crouch. He held the seat with a majority of 14,891.

Parliamentary career

Brazier became the Parliamentary Private Secretary (PPS) to Gillian Shephard, the Minister of State at the Treasury. He remained Shephard's PPS following the 1992 general election in her new capacity as the Secretary of State for Employment, but he resigned in 1993 as a protest against defence cuts. He was awarded the 'Backbencher of the Year' at the annual Spectator magazine awards in 1996. Following the 1997 general election, he became a member of the Defence Select committee.

Beginning in 1998, Brazier led a campaign opposing the closure of Kent and Canterbury Hospital and in support of its Cancer Centre. This included multiple adjournment debates in the Commons, questions to the minister, and taking part in public demonstrations. The initial plans for shutdown were overturned in 2005, but he continued to campaign in 2017.

Following the 2001 general election that Brazier was given a job by Iain Duncan Smith, then Leader of the Opposition, initially as an Opposition Whip in 2001, he became a spokesman on Work and Pensions in 2002.

He was briefly Home Affairs spokesman in 2003, before being moved later in the year by Michael Howard, who had succeeded Duncan Smith, to be a spokesman on International Affairs. Brazier remained on the frontbench after the 2005 general election as a spokesman on Transport (Shipping & Aviation).

Brazier was a member of the Cornerstone Group of Conservative MPs.  This group is considered to be on the right of the Conservative Party, and away from the more centrist direction of the leadership. As a practising Roman Catholic, he is a social conservative. Brazier supported a bill put forth by Laurence Robertson in June 2005 that would have put heavy restraints on abortion.

In 2008, he proposed a law that would allow parliament to ban seriously violent films and games, even if the BBFC had approved them.

During the run up to the 2016 EU membership referendum, Julian Brazier was in favour of leaving the EU.

Towards the end of the Lebanese Civil War, Brazier visited Beirut and Lebanese president Michel Aoun, while the city was besieged by Syrian occupation forces. In 1996 he returned, organising the British delegation to an Anglo-Lebanese conference on Freedom and Democracy held in defiance of the Syrian-backed regime but attended by the UK and US ambassadors. He later returned in 2006 as UK representative at an international protest against the treatment of Lebanese lawyer, Dr Muhamad Mugraby, who had exposed the arrest and illegal detentions during the Syrian-dominated era.

Brazier consistently voted against bills furthering LGBT rights, including equaling the age of consent, civil partnerships and scrapping the controversial Section 28 act, which banned teachers from "promoting homosexuality" or "teaching ... the acceptability of homosexuality as a pretended family relationship". He opposed the legalisation of same-sex marriage, saying that it would "undermine a treasured institution and could have unforeseen consequences". Brazier was also quoted as saying, "We shouldn’t allow an institution of this importance to be re-defined simply to meet a rights agenda".

Because of his earlier career, Brazier has a special interest in the armed forces and was an advocate of military issues in the House of Commons. He was also a member of the Public Bill Committee for the Defence Reform Act 2014. In 2010, Brazier was appointed by Prime Minister David Cameron as a member of a three person commission to plan the future of Britain's reserve armed forces. This reported in July 2011, providing a blueprint which was subsequent largely adopted by the government in its 2013 white paper. In May 2014, he was one of eight candidates for the chairmanship of the House of Commons Defence Select Committee. Although unsuccessful, he came third on the first round, and was eliminated after six rounds of voting. He served as a member of the committee from 2010 to 2014, when he was appointed Minister for Reserves at the Ministry of Defence.

As co-chairman of the All Party Group for Adventure and Recreation in Society, Brazier campaigned against the impact of so-called compensation culture and excessive health and safety legislation on adventure opportunities for young people. For this, he was shortlisted for the Grassroot Diplomat Initiative Award in 2015, and he remains in the directory of the Grassroot Diplomat Who's Who publication.

Brazier was knighted in the 2017 New Year Honours. At the general election 2017, he narrowly lost his seat to Labour's Rosie Duffield.

Subsequent career 
Following his defeat in the 2017 general election, Brazier became non-executive chairman of a 'counter terrorism' security company, and non-executive director of a virtual reality startup, as well as a member of the Council of the Air League. He remains a trustee of the Summer Camps Trust.

Personal life
Brazier married Katharine Elizabeth Blagden on 21 July 1984 in Hampshire. The couple have three sons (twins born July 1990, and another son born December 1992). His youngest son, John, was elected councillor for Westgate ward at the 2015 Canterbury City Council election, and resigned in 2017. He is the son-in-law of Brigadier Paddy Blagden, a United Nations de-mining expert.

In February 2002, Brazier was given a four-month suspended sentence after he crashed into and killed a motorcyclist in Italy on 29 August 2001. Brazier had been driving on the wrong side of the road approaching a sharp bend when he hit a motorcyclist, 42-year-old Carlo Civitelli, near Siena. He used his TA training to give Civitelli first aid at the scene, but the man died three days later. Italian police found that Mr Civitelli's helmet was not properly fitted and that he was probably speeding. After the verdict, Brazier said in a statement: "I am still deeply saddened by the tragic consequences of my lapse of attention. My thoughts are with the Civitelli family whose reaction to the whole terrible business has been so generous". He also said "as a parent, I shall carry the memory of this man's death with me for the rest of my life."

References

External links
Profile at the Conservative Party
Canterbury Conservatives
All-Party Parliamentary Group for Reserve Forces

1953 births
Living people
English Roman Catholics
People educated at The Dragon School
People educated at Wellington College, Berkshire
Presidents of the Oxford University Conservative Association
Alumni of Brasenose College, Oxford
British Parachute Regiment officers
Special Air Service officers
Conservative Party (UK) MPs for English constituencies
UK MPs 1987–1992
UK MPs 1992–1997
UK MPs 1997–2001
UK MPs 2001–2005
UK MPs 2005–2010
UK MPs 2010–2015
UK MPs 2015–2017
Politics of Canterbury
Knights Bachelor
Politicians awarded knighthoods
People from Dartford
20th-century British Army personnel
Military personnel from Kent